Bernard King (born December 4, 1956) is an American former professional basketball player at the small forward position in the National Basketball Association (NBA). He played 14 seasons with the New Jersey Nets, Utah Jazz, Golden State Warriors, New York Knicks, and Washington Bullets. King is a four-time NBA All-Star, four-time All-NBA selection and led the NBA in scoring in the 1984–85 season. He was inducted into the Naismith Memorial Basketball Hall of Fame on September 8, 2013. His younger brother, Albert, also played in the NBA during his career.

NBA career

New Jersey Nets
King attended college at the University of Tennessee and played college basketball for the Tennessee Volunteers. The New York Nets selected King with the seventh overall pick in the 1977 NBA draft, Months later, the Nets relocated from Uniondale, New York, to New Jersey and became known as the New Jersey Nets.

At  and 205 pounds, King was an explosive, high-scoring small forward utilizing long arms and a quick release. King was a tremendous scorer, and led the NBA in scoring in the  season with 32.9 points per game and was selected twice to the All-NBA First Team and four times to the NBA All-Star Game.

In 1977–78, his rookie season, King set a New Jersey Nets franchise record for most points scored in a season with 1,909, at 24.2 points per game. He would surpass this record with his 2,027-point season in 1983–84, earning the first of his back-to-back All-NBA First Team selections.

Utah Jazz
King played for the Utah Jazz in the 1979–80 season and averaged 9.3 points per game in 19 games.

Golden State Warriors
The Jazz traded King to the Golden State Warriors before the 1980–81 season. Over two years, he averaged 21.9 points per game, in his first year playing alongside players such as 1980 NBA All-Star World B. Free, Joe Barry Carroll, and Clifford Ray and 23.2 points per game in his second year with the team. Just before the start of the 1982–83 season, King was traded to the New York Knicks in exchange for Micheal Ray Richardson.

New York Knicks
On a Texas road trip on January 31 and February 1, 1984, King made history by becoming the first player since Rick Barry in 1967 to score at least 50 points in consecutive games. He scored 50 points on 20 for 30 shooting with 10 free throws in a 117–113 Knicks' victory over the San Antonio Spurs on January 31. King followed this with another 50-point performance at Dallas, setting a Reunion Arena single-game scoring record in the process. He scored 11 points in both the first and second quarters and 14 points in both the third and fourth quarters. King drew 13 fouls on Dallas Mavericks defenders, including Mark Aguirre, who fouled out. King shot 20 for 28 from the field with 10 free throws in the 105–98 win over the Mavericks.

The next season, on Christmas Day, 1984, King lit up the New Jersey Nets for 60 points in a losing effort, becoming just the tenth player in NBA history to score 60 or more points in a single game. King had scored 40 points by halftime, and finished the game with 19 of 30 shooting from the field and 22 of 26 from the free throw line.

At the peak of his career, however, King suffered a devastating injury to his right leg while planting it under the hoop attempting to block a dunk by Kansas City King Reggie Theus. The March 23, 1985, injury, which included a torn anterior cruciate ligament, torn knee cartilage, and broken leg bone, required major reconstruction, causing King to miss all of the 1985–86 season. To that point no NBA player had returned to form after such a potentially career-ending injury, surgery, and loss of time.

Rehabilitating completely out of the media spotlight, King drove himself back into competitive shape. Despite averaging 22.7 points per game during his first six games back, he had not recovered his pre-injury explosiveness and was released by the Knicks at the end of the 1987 season.

Washington Bullets
King spent the 1987–88 season climbing back to his former stature as a scorer with the Washington Bullets. That season, during which King, fellow all-star journeyman Moses Malone, and Jeff Malone teamed up to form a formidable trio, would be the only time Washington made the playoffs during King's tenure. In the first round, the Bullets lost a contested five game series 3-2 against the up and coming Detroit Pistons, who would go on to make the NBA Finals.

On November 3, 1990, King scored 44 points in a win over Michael Jordan and the Bulls, which was the most points King had scored in a game since his devastating 1985 knee injury. On December 29, in a game against the Denver Nuggets, King scored a season high 52 points in a 161-133 victory. It was the most points a Washington player had scored since the team moved from Baltimore in 1972. That season, King was selected to his fourth all-star team.

From 1989 to 1991, King averaged 20-plus points in three consecutive seasons. His scoring average peaked at 28.4 points per game at age 34 in 1991, which included ten games where King scored more than 40 points.

New Jersey Nets
After a year-and-a-half hiatus due to yet another knee injury, King returned for a 32-game stint with the New Jersey Nets at the end of the 1992–93 season, until knee problems forced him to retire from the NBA permanently.

NBA career statistics
King retired with 19,655 points in 874 games, good for a 22.5 points per game average and number 16 on the all-time NBA scoring list at the time of his retirement.

Regular season

|-
| style="text-align:left;"|
| style="text-align:left;"|New Jersey
| 79 ||  || 39.1 || .479 ||  || .677 || 9.5 || 2.4 || 1.5 || .5 || 24.2
|-
| style="text-align:left;"|
| style="text-align:left;"|New Jersey
| 82 ||  || 34.9 || .522 ||  || .564 || 8.2 || 3.6 || 1.4 || .5 || 21.6
|-
| style="text-align:left;"|
| style="text-align:left;"|Utah
| 19 ||  || 22.1 || .518 ||  || .540 || 4.6 || 2.7 || .4 || .2 || 9.3
|-
| style="text-align:left;"|
| style="text-align:left;"|Golden State
| 81 ||  || 36.0 || .588 || .333 || .703 || 6.8 || 3.5 || .9 || .4 || 21.9
|-
| style="text-align:left;"|
| style="text-align:left;"|Golden State
| 79 || 77 || 36.2 || .566 || .200 || .705 || 5.9 || 3.6 || 1.0 || .3 || 23.2
|-
| style="text-align:left;"|
| style="text-align:left;"|New York
| 68 || 68 || 32.5 || .528 || .000 || .722 || 4.8 || 2.9 || 1.3 || .2 || 21.9
|-
| style="text-align:left;"|
| style="text-align:left;"|New York
| 77 || 76 || 34.6 || .572 || .000 || .779 || 5.1 || 2.1 || 1.0 || .2 || 26.3
|-
| style="text-align:left;"|
| style="text-align:left;"|New York
| 55 || 55 || 37.5 || .530 || .100 || .772 || 5.8 || 3.7 || 1.3 || .3 || style="background:#cfecec;"|32.9*
|-
| style="text-align:left;"|
| style="text-align:left;"|New York
| 6 || 4 || 35.7 || .495 ||  || .744 || 5.3 || 3.2 || .3 || .0 || 22.7
|-
| style="text-align:left;"|
| style="text-align:left;"|Washington
| 69 || 38 || 29.6 || .501 || .167 || .762 || 4.1 || 2.8 || .7 || .1 || 17.2
|-
| style="text-align:left;"|
| style="text-align:left;"|Washington
| 81 || 81 || 31.6 || .477 || .167 || .819 || 4.7 || 3.6 || .8 || .2 || 20.7
|-
| style="text-align:left;"|
| style="text-align:left;"|Washington
| 82 || 82 || 32.8 || .487 || .130 || .803 || 4.9 || 4.6 || .6 || .1 || 22.4
|-
| style="text-align:left;"|
| style="text-align:left;"|Washington
| 64 || 64 || 37.5 || .472 || .216 || .790 || 5.0 || 4.6 || .9 || .3 || 28.4
|-
| style="text-align:left;"|
| style="text-align:left;"|New Jersey
| 32 || 2 || 13.4 || .514 || .286 || .684 || 2.4 || .6 || .3 || .1 || 7.0
|- class="sortbottom"
| style="text-align:center;" colspan="2"|Career
| 874 || 547 || 33.7 || .518 || .172 || .730 || 5.8 || 3.3 || 1.0 || .3 || 22.5
|- class="sortbottom"
| style="text-align:center;" colspan="2"|All-Star
| 4 || 1 || 21.0 || .474 ||  || .692 || 4.3 || 2.3 || .8 || .5 || 11.3

Playoffs

|-
| style="text-align:left;"|1979
| style="text-align:left;"|New Jersey
| 2 ||  || 40.5 || .500 ||  || .417 || 5.5 || 3.5 || 2.0 || .0 || 26.0
|-
| style="text-align:left;"|1983
| style="text-align:left;"|New York
| 6 ||  || 30.7 || .577 || .333 || .800 || 4.0 || 2.2 || .3 || .0 || 23.5
|-
| style="text-align:left;"|1984
| style="text-align:left;"|New York
| 12 ||  || 39.8 || .574 || .000 || .756 || 6.2 || 3.0 || 1.2 || .5 || 34.8
|-
| style="text-align:left;"|1988
| style="text-align:left;"|Washington
| 5 || 4 || 33.6 || .491 ||  || .810 || 2.2 || 1.8 || .6 || .0 || 13.8
|-
| style="text-align:left;"|1993
| style="text-align:left;"|New Jersey
| 3 || 1 || 8.0 || .571 ||  ||  || .3 || .0 || .3 || .0 || 2.7
|- class="sortbottom"
| style="text-align:center;" colspan="2"|Career
| 28 || 5 || 33.4 || .559 || .250 || .729 || 4.3 || 2.3 || .9 || .2 || 24.5

Awards and recognition
At the age of 24, King won the NBA Comeback Player of the Year Award for his play during the 1980–1981 season with the Golden State Warriors. That year, King averaged 21.9 points per game after having played just 19 games the season before with the Utah Jazz.

On February 13, 2007, Bernard King's number 53 was retired at the halftime of the Tennessee-Kentucky basketball game at Thompson–Boling Arena in Knoxville, Tennessee. His jersey number was the first jersey number retired by the Volunteers, who later retired the number of Ernie Grunfeld, King's former teammate. The late 1970s Tennessee men's basketball team was known as the "Ernie and Bernie Show" (in reference to Grunfeld and King) and is viewed by many as the golden age of UT men's basketball. During an ESPN interview after halftime, King stated he had not returned to the University of Tennessee in more than 30 years, but expressed his sincere appreciation to the university and his plans to return again. His reason for not visiting his alma mater was simply that he had not been asked. King's ceremony punctuated an 89–85 Tennessee victory over the visiting Wildcats.

During the 2006 NBA All-Star Game, a panel of basketball analysts for the TNT network selected Bernard King as one of nominees of the "Next 10", a list of 10 unofficial additions to the NBA's 50 greatest players list in honor of the NBA's 60th anniversary.

In 2013, he was elected to the Naismith Memorial Basketball Hall of Fame with inductees such as Rick Pitino and Gary Payton.

Broadcasting career
King is now working as a part-time broadcaster for NBA TV as well as the MSG Network, filling in on some occasions as color commentator when Walt Frazier is on vacation.

Acting career
King made an appearance in Miami Vice as Matt Ferguson, son of Judge Roger Ferguson (played by Bill Russell), a basketball star with the fictitious Florida Sunblazers in the episode "The Fix". He also appeared in the 1979 movie Fast Break (with Reb Brown).

Personal life
While playing for the Jazz, King was arrested and then suspended by the NBA for cocaine possession. This was in the same season that his teammate Terry Furlow died in a car accident where the autopsy showed that cocaine was in his bloodstream. On January 1, 1980, he was also charged with multiple counts of forced sodomy, later being convicted for the misdemeanor of "Attempted Forcible Sexual Assault". King took six different lie detector tests claiming that he was so drunk he had no recollection of what had happened that night, passing each test.

See also
List of National Basketball Association career turnovers leaders
List of individual National Basketball Association scoring leaders by season
List of National Basketball Association top rookie scoring averages
List of National Basketball Association players with most points in a game

References

External links

Bernard King bio @ NBA.com
"The Incandescent King" @ nytimes.com
 

1956 births
Living people
African-American basketball players
All-American college men's basketball players
American men's basketball players
Basketball players from New York City
Fort Hamilton High School alumni
Golden State Warriors players
Naismith Memorial Basketball Hall of Fame inductees
National Basketball Association All-Stars
New Jersey Nets draft picks
New Jersey Nets players
New York Knicks players
New York Nets draft picks
People from Franklin Lakes, New Jersey
Small forwards
Sportspeople from Brooklyn
Tennessee Volunteers basketball players
Utah Jazz players
Washington Bullets players
21st-century African-American people
20th-century African-American sportspeople